Hammarby IF Handboll is the handball section of Swedish sports club Hammarby IF from Stockholm. Hammarby IF currently play in Handbollsligan, Sweden's first tier.

The club won three consecutive Swedish championships from 2006 to 2008.

History
The handboll section of Hammarby IF was founded on 31 October 1939. During the 1950s, the handboll section ceased its activities. The club made a comeback in the 1970s when another local team, Lundens BK, merged with the club.

Hammarby were promoted to Elitserien, Sweden's top tier, for the first time in 2002. In 2003, Hammarby signed the Swedish international Staffan Olsson, who returned to his native country after a long career in Germany. In 2004–05 Hammarby reached the semifinals, eliminating IF Guif in the quarterfinals before losing to IFK Skövde in the semifinals. The following season, Hammarby won their first Swedish championship, defeating IK Sävehof by 34–31 in the final, breaking the dominance of clubs from southern and western Götaland that had won all domestic titles since 1978. Olsson retired from playing in 2006, instead taking over as manager of Hammarby (a position that he stayed in until 2011). In 2006–07, Hammarby defended the title, winning the final against IFK Skövde by 34–22. They won their third consecutive title in 2008, again defeating IK Sävehof in the final, this time by 35–29. In 2008–09, Hammarby reached the semifinals, but were eliminated by Alingsås HK.

On November 14 2006, the match between Hammarby IF from Stockholm and LIF Lindesberg from Lindesberg was the highest scoring match ever in Elitserien. Hammarby won with the numbers 53–40. The total was 93 goals.

Between 2009 and 2018, Hammarby finished between 6th and 13th in the league and did not reached past the quarterfinals in the play-offs. In 2019, Hammarby was relegated to the second tier Allsvenskan, but won a promotion back to Handbollsligan two seasons later. 

In 2023 Hammarby reached the final of the Swedish cup, a final played home and away against IFK Kristianstad. Hammarby won the away match 31–30, but in the home match they lost 35–32 after shoot-outs, and therefore got silvermedal.

Kits

Sports Hall information

Name: – Eriksdalshallen
City: – Stockholm
Capacity: – 2600
Address: – Ringvägen 70, 118 61 Stockholm, Sweden

Current squad
Squad for the 2022–23 season

Goalkeepers
 1  Linus Bergh
 16  Alexander Holmberg
 97  Hayder Al-Khafadji
Left Wingers
 4  Simon Lindberg
 9  Nils Pettersson
 11  Martin Dolk
 17  Ludvig Lindeberg
Right Wingers
 8  Topias Laine
 10  Oliver Wigmark
 15  Johan Nilsson
 20  Felix Wallberg
Line players
 3  Kevin Johansson Eggan
 5  Alexander Morsten
 6  Jakob Magnusson

Left Backs
 13  Max Gugolz
 21  Anders Wiik Rydberg
 25  Gustav Davidsson
Centre Backs
 22  Viktor Ahlstrand
 30  Robin Sanderhem
 46  Mattias Windahl
Right Backs
 7  Richard Lindström
 18  Edwin Aspenbäck

Technical staff

Notable players
  (2003-2008)
 Martin Dolk (2006-2014, 2015-)
 Patrik Fahlgren (2017-2019, coach since 2018)
 Lukas Karlsson (2000-2007)
 Tobias Karlsson (2003-2008)
  (2005-2009)
 Staffan Olsson (2003-2006, coach 2005-2011)
 Lucas Pellas (2004-2016)
 Fredric Pettersson (2008-2011)
 Josef Pujol (2005-2016)

Honours

 Swedish Champions
 Winners (3): 2006, 2007, 2008
 Swedish Cup
 Runner-ups (1): 2023

References

External links
  
 

Swedish handball clubs
Sport in Stockholm
1939 establishments in Sweden
Handball clubs established in 1939